Wasteland is a compilation by The Jam which was released in 1992. It is a collection of their earlier songs. Essentially, it was budget-priced but despite the key of release, it sold well.

Track listing
All songs written by Paul Weller except as noted.

 "News Of The World" (Bruce Foxton)
 "Burning Sky"
 "Saturday's Kids"
 "Art School"
 "In The Street Today" (Paul Weller/David Waller)
 "Non-Stop Dancing"
 "Wasteland"
 "In The City"
 "Strange Town"
 "Standards"
 "A-Bomb In Wardour Street"
 "In The Crowd"
 "London Girl"
 "David Watts" (Ray Davies)
 "I Got By In Time"
 "All Around The World"

References

The Jam albums
1992 compilation albums